Richard Reid is an Australian-based American entertainment reporter. He is known for his daily Hollywood gossip segment on the Nine Network's breakfast program Today from 2006 until 2015. During this time, he was also the resident style expert on Nine's makeover show, Domestic Blitz and appeared on other Nine programs such as 20 to One.

More recently, he has been a regular contributor to Network Ten's morning program, Studio 10.

In 2015, Reid appeared on the fourth season of Nine's reality show, The Celebrity Apprentice Australia.

In 2019, Reid appeared on the fifth season of Network Ten reality show, I'm a Celebrity...Get Me Out of Here!.

Biography 
Hired as an entertainment reporter for Northwest Cable News in Seattle, Washington, Richard caused a stir in 1999 when he became the first openly gay on-air personality in the region. He quickly became known for his hilarious celebrity interviews, insider gossip and his ‘Richard’s Reels’ movie reviews.

In 2004, Richard moved to Hollywood and established a name for himself as a producer, creating daily stories for Access Hollywood, Entertainment Tonight, The Insider and the E! Network. While working on the Paramount Pictures lot, Richard began doing the occasional gossip cross for the Australian Today Show which immediately caught on with viewers. Soon, that once-a-week segment became a permanent fixture, culminating with four live crosses to Hollywood each and every day. He remained with the show for 8 years.

In 2008, Richard joined forces with Scott Cam and Shelley Craft as a team member on the popular Sunday night reality series Domestic Blitz. The show ran for four series.

Having parted ways with Today, he would work again with Nine Network in 2015 as a cast member on the fourth season of The Celebrity Apprentice Australia. While he appeared on every episode, he was fired in a double elimination on the second to the last episode.

In 2019, Richard was lured back into the reality show genre, flying to South Africa to join series five of I'm a Celebrity Get Me Out of Here! The Network Ten series proved to be a major hit with viewers, who in turn crowned Richard “King of the Jungle,” winning the entire series.

In July 2019, Reid made his Australian stage debut in Bonnie Lythgoe’s spectacular 3D musical production of Jack and Beanstalk at Sydney's historic State Theatre.

Dividing his time between Los Angeles and Sydney, Richard appears as a contributing panelist on Network Ten’s morning show Studio Ten.

In February 2020, Reid was featured in First Dates Australia.

References 

1968 births
Living people
21st-century American journalists
American television reporters and correspondents
American male journalists
The Apprentice Australia candidates
I'm a Celebrity...Get Me Out of Here! (Australian TV series) winners
I'm a Celebrity...Get Me Out of Here! (Australian TV series) participants
Place of birth missing (living people)